Govinda-bhaṭṭa, known by his pen name Akbariya Kālidāsa ("Kalidasa of Akbar"), was a 16th-century Sanskrit-language court poet from present-day India. His patrons included Rewa's ruler Ramachandra and the Mughal emperor Akbar.

Works 

The texts attributed to Govindabhatta include:

 Akabari-vilasa
 Birudavali
 Ramachandra-yashah-prabandha, a panegyric on Ramachandra of Rewa
 Stutimalika

Govindabhatta appears to have become quite popular, as his verses appear in at least six anthologies of the 17th and the 18th centuries. The texts that cite his verses include Subhashita-haravali (c. 1650), Padyamrta-tarangini (c. 1673), Rasika-jivana (later than c. 1735), Sundaradeva's Sukti-Sundara, Padyareni, and Padyarchana.

Most of Govindabhatta's extant verses are devoted to description and praise of kings. The kings praised by him include Akbar (whom he calls Kabilendra or Jallaladin) and Ramachandra of Rewa (whom he calls Vaghela). He may have adopted the pen-name "Akbariya Kalidasa" to please Emperor Akbar.

In his poems, Govindabhatta pays homage to the gods Vishnu, Shiva, Bhavani, Ganesha, Krishna, Durga, and Jvalapa (Jvalamukhi).

See also 

 Tansen, another courtier of Akbar originally in service of Ramachandra

References

Bibliography 

 
 

16th-century Indian poets
Sanskrit poets
Indian male poets
Akbar
Mughal Empire poets